Rome Express is a 1950 French comedy thriller film directed by Christian Stengel and starring Hélène Perdrière, Jean Debucourt and Denise Grey. It was shot at the Franstudio complex at Joinville Studios in Paris. The film's sets were designed by the art director Robert Hubert. Although using a similar theme and location, it is not a remake of the 1932 British film Rome Express.

Synopsis
Five woman are invited by a mysterious correspondent to catch a train from Paris to Rome. They begin to disappear one by one from the sleeping car, and Inspector Giovanni investigate the mysterious situation with many potential suspects onboard.

Cast
 Hélène Perdrière as  Hélène
 Jean Debucourt as Lacaze
  Denise Grey as  Margot
  Saturnin Fabre as le professeur
  Arthur Devère as  Jeff Lambick
  Jacqueline Pierreux as  Nicole
  Charles Dechamps as Delafosse
  Robert Pizani as  Cornaglia
  Jean Tissier as Giovanni
  Jacqueline Dor as  Denise
  Roger Caccia as Pigeonnet
  Mario Podesta as Valentino
  Philippe Clay as  un employé de la SNCF
  René Hell as  Le manager
 Georges Paulais as  Le commissaire
  Madeleine Barbulée as la libraire
  Nicolas Amato
  Jacky Blanchot
 Julien Maffre

References

Bibliography 
 Rège, Philippe. Encyclopedia of French Film Directors, Volume 1. Scarecrow Press, 2009.

External links 
 

1950 films
1950s thriller films
French thriller films
1950s French-language films
Films directed by Christian Stengel
French black-and-white films
1950s French films
Films shot at Joinville Studios
Films set in Paris
Films set on trains